Clark Bertram Accord (6 March 1961 – 11 May 2011) was a Surinamese–Dutch author and makeup artist.

Writing 
His debut book, published in 1999, was De koningin van Paramaribo (The Queen of Paramaribo), written about the life of Maxi Linder; he later adapted the story into both a play and a musical. The book became a bestseller with more than 120,000 copies sold, released in Germany, Spain, Latin America and Finland. His second novel, Tussen Apoera en Oreala (Between Apoera and Oreala), appeared in 2005, and is a love story set in the rainforests of Suriname. His third novel, Bingo!, came out in 2007 and is a story about a compulsive Surinamese gambler. Besides writing books he wrote articles for magazines and newspapers, including Elsevier, M, Elle and Marie Claire.

In 2007, he received the Bronze Bull for Art and Culture of the Surinamese community in the Netherlands. On 7 May 2011, shortly before his death from stomach cancer, Clark Accord was awarded the Honorary Order of the Yellow Star on behalf of the President of Suriname.

Bibliography 
 1999: De koningin van Paramaribo (The Queen of Paramaribo)
 2005: Tussen Apoera en Oreala (Between Apoera and Oreala)
 2009: Bingo!

References

External links
Clark Accord Foundation

1961 births
2011 deaths
Surinamese journalists
Surinamese novelists
Dutch male novelists
People from Paramaribo
Honorary Order of the Yellow Star
20th-century Dutch novelists
20th-century Dutch male writers
21st-century Dutch novelists
21st-century Dutch male writers
Deaths from stomach cancer
Deaths from cancer in the Netherlands